When We Wake Up is the fourth studio album by Swiss recording artist Luca Hänni. It was released by Muve Recordings on 18 September 2015 in German-speaking Europe.

Track listing

Charts

References

External links
 

2015 albums
Luca Hänni albums